Back to Me is the second studio album by Canadian singer-songwriter Kathleen Edwards. It was released March 1, 2005 on the independent labels MapleMusic in Canada and Zoë Records in the United States.

The album reached #176 on the Billboard 200 and #6 on the Top Heatseekers chart.

Track listing

"In State" (Edwards) – 3:56
"Back to Me" (Edwards, Colin Cripps) – 3:29
"Pink Emerson Radio" (Edwards) – 4:25
"Independent Thief" (Edwards) – 4:44
"Old Time Sake" (Edwards, Peter Cash) – 4:59
"Summerlong" (Edwards, Cripps) – 4:04
"What Are You Waiting For?" (Edwards) – 4:43
"Away" (Edwards) – 3:31
"Somewhere Else" (Jim Bryson) – 3:47
"Copied Keys" (Edwards) – 5:06
"Good Things" (Edwards) – 5:51

Personnel

 Kathleen Edwards – electric, acoustic guitars, banjo, strings
 Kevin McCarragher – bass
 Joel Anderson – drums
 Colin Cripps – electric guitars, slide, hammertone, tambourine
 Benmont Tench – organ, piano
 Richard Bell – accordion
 Peter von Althen – tambourine
 Craig Durrance – mixing and mastering

External links
Zoë Records

2005 albums
Kathleen Edwards albums
Albums produced by Pierre Marchand
Zoë Records albums